John Daniel Hicks (born June 2, 1962) is an American sportscaster for NBC Sports since 1992.

Early years
Born and raised in Tucson, Arizona, Hicks graduated from Sabino High School in 1980 and from the University of Arizona in 1984. After starting in radio, he was a weekend sports anchor on KVOA, the NBC affiliate in Tucson. Hicks moved east to work as a sports reporter for CNN in Atlanta in 1989 and went to NBC Sports in 1992.

NBC Sports
Hicks's primary duties for the network include play-by-play commentary for golf, but he took over as play-by-play commentator for Notre Dame football in 2013, replacing Tom Hammond and continuing on the position to NFL Wildcard Saturday. He called the AFC Wildcard matchup in 2014, where the Indianapolis Colts defeated the Kansas City Chiefs in the second-biggest comeback in NFL playoff history. In 2019 he joined NBC's coverage of the French Open tennis tournament.

Hicks was a play-by-play man for NBA on NBC and NFL on NBC, and was a tower announcer for NBC's golf coverage until Dick Enberg left NBC for CBS in 2000, promoting Hicks to the top spot. He formerly served as the primary anchor for NBC's sports updates every weekend and also hosted NBC's now-defunct annual winter sports special, Ice.

Olympics
Hicks has been regularly involved in NBC's Olympic Games coverage. During the Summer Olympics, he is the stroke-by-stroke announcer for swimming, a role he has held since 1996, and was the play-by-play announcer for speed skating for the Winter Olympics in 2002, 2006 and 2010. He moved to alpine skiing for the 2014 and 2018 Games, taking over for the retired Tim Ryan, in addition to formerly serving as co-host of the Closing Ceremony. At the 2000 Summer Olympics, Hicks called diving, a role he returned to for a single day at the 2012 Summer Olympics in London, subbing for Ted Robinson, who was assigned to call the gold medal match in men's tennis on the same day. At the 2002 Winter Olympics and 2004 Summer Olympics, Hicks served as late-night anchor, although in 2004, Pat O'Brien served as late-night host for the first week of the games because of Hicks' swimming duties. Hicks also hosted the former CNBC show The Olympic Show.

One of Hicks' most memorable calls came during the men's 4×100 freestyle relay at the 2008 Summer Olympics, as he announced the USA's come-from-behind win over France:

Personal life
While at CNN, Hicks met his wife, Hannah Storm, currently an anchor on ESPN's SportsCenter; they were married on January 8, 1994. The couple lives in Greenwich, Connecticut, with their three daughters: Hannah, Ellery, and Riley Hicks. Storm is an alumna of Notre Dame.

References

External links

 NBC Sports: Dan Hicks
 "What makes Hicks tick?" Winter 2002 article on Hicks and Storm from UA's alumni magazine

1962 births
Living people
American television sports announcers
Arena football announcers
College football announcers
Figure skating commentators
Golf writers and broadcasters
National Basketball Association broadcasters
National Football League announcers
Notre Dame Fighting Irish football announcers
Olympic Games broadcasters
Skiing announcers
Sportspeople from Greenwich, Connecticut
People from Tucson, Arizona
Swimming commentators
Tennis commentators
University of Arizona alumni